Michael Allen Geist (born July 11, 1968) is a Canadian academic, the Canada Research Chair in Internet and E-Commerce Law at the University of Ottawa and a member of the Centre for Law, Technology and Society. Geist was educated at the University of Western Ontario, Osgoode Hall Law School, where he received his Bachelor of Laws, Cambridge University, where he received a Master of Laws, and Columbia Law School, where he received a Master of Laws and Doctor of Law degree. He has been a visiting professor at universities around the world including the University of Haifa, Hong Kong University, and Tel Aviv University. He is also a senior fellow at the Centre for International Governance Innovation.

Geist is the editor of many books including Law, Privacy and Surveillance in Canada in the Post-Snowden Era (2015, University of Ottawa Press), The Copyright Pentalogy: How the Supreme Court of Canada Shook the Foundations of Canadian Copyright Law (2013, University of Ottawa Press), From "Radical Extremism" to "Balanced Copyright": Canadian Copyright and the Digital Agenda (2010, Irwin Law) and In the Public Interest:  The Future of Canadian Copyright Law (2005, Irwin Law). He is a regular columnist in The Globe and Mail, the editor of several monthly technology law publications, and the author of www.michaelgeist.ca, a popular blog on the Internet and intellectual property law issues.  

Geist serves on many boards, including Ingenium, Internet Archive Canada, and the EFF Advisory Board. He is the chair of Waterfront Toronto's Digital Strategy Advisory Panel. He was appointed to the Order of Ontario in 2018 and was awarded the Vox Libera Award for his contribution to freedom of expression by Canadian Journalists for Freedom of Expression (CJFE) in 2018. He has received numerous other awards for his work including the University of Ottawa Open Access Award in 2016, Kroeger Award for Policy Leadership and the Public Knowledge IP3 Award in 2010, the Les Fowlie Award for Intellectual Freedom from the Ontario Library Association in 2009, the EFF's Pioneer Award in 2008, and Canarie's IWAY Public Leadership Award for his contribution to the development of the Internet in Canada. Geist was named one of Canada's Top 40 Under 40 in 2002. In 2010, he was listed globally as one of the top fifty influential people in regard to intellectual property by Managing Intellectual Property. Canadian Lawyer named him one of the 25 most influential lawyers in Canada in 2011, 2012, and 2013.

Copyright Law
Geist has received widespread public attention from mainstream and citizen media for leading the public response to Canadian copyright law.

According to Geist, in 2007, proposed Canadian legislation included the worst aspects of the 1998 U.S. Digital Millennium Copyright Act (DMCA). In December 2007, Geist said the legislation will likely "mirror the DMCA with strong anti-circumvention legislation—far beyond what is needed to comply with the WIPO Internet treaties", and will likely contain no protection for "flexible fair dealing. No parody exception. No time shifting exception. No device shifting exception. No expanded backup provision. Nothing."

Widespread online and offline support, from activist and author Cory Doctorow to over 90,000 Facebook users, led to the tabling of the copyright legislation by Industry Minister Jim Prentice until 2008.

Geist has continued to play a prominent role on copyright in Canada, with numerous articles, speeches, books, and appearances before House of Commons and Senate committees on the subject. In December 2010, he wrote a paper titled "Clearing Up the Copyright Confusion: Fair Dealing and Bill C-32" where he summarizes and critically examines some of the main issues of this bill.

Then in October 2011, when the Canadian government began attempts to pass a new bill on copyright reform, which included digital lock rules, called Bill C-11, he wrote "The Daily Digital Lock Dissenter" on his blog. This was a daily blog entry where he introduced former submissions to the government about how Canadians felt about the restrictive digital lock regulations in regard to Bill C-32 and based on the 2009 national copyright consultation. He argued that while Bill C-11 had some valid points, it was too restrictive because it did not take a balanced approach and it was "primarily about satisfying U.S. pressure, not public opinion".

Trade: ACTA, the TPP and USMCA
Geist is considered an expert about the intellectual property and digital trade issues associated with trade agreements such as the failed international Anti-Counterfeiting Trade Agreement (ACTA), which he covered frequently on his blog, criticizing the negotiation process for lack of transparency and warning of possible negative consequences for Internet users. He was similarly active in assessing the implications of the Trans Pacific Partnership and reforms to NAFTA, later called the USMCA in the United States or CUSMA in Canada.

Telecom: Usage-based billing and Net Neutrality
In 2011, Geist criticized the Canadian Radio-television and Telecommunications Commission's (CRTC) history of inability to foster an atmosphere of competition that would allow third-party internet service providers (ISPs) to gain a foothold in the Canadian market. He did note, with the CRTC's usage based oral hearing on July 19, 2011, that they were making efforts to address this lack of competition and criticized Bell Canada and other major companies for their involvement in limiting smaller ISPs. 
Also in 2011, he wrote a study on the true transport costs of a gigabyte for a Canadian consumer from an ISP and concluded it was roughly a total of eight cents per gigabyte but this report was later denounced by the major ISPs, most notably Bell Canada.

Geist has been a vocal supporter of net neutrality in Canada, writing widely on the subject and frequently discussing the issue in the mainstream media. In 2017, he appeared before the House of Commons Standing Committee on Access to Information, Privacy and Ethics to explain the key concerns to Members of Parliament.

Privacy
Geist is an advocate on privacy protection. He is the editor of the Canadian Privacy Law Review and served on the Privacy Commissioner of Canada's Expert Advisory Board. He is the editor of the 2015 book, Law, Privacy and Surveillance in Canada in the Post-Snowden Era. He has regularly appeared before House of Commons committees to discuss privacy and potential reforms.

Website blocking 
In 2018, Geist opposed a proposal to establish a website-blocking system in Canada to be overseen by the Canadian Radio-television and Telecommunications Commission. He wrote dozens of widely cited posts on concerns with the proposal. The CRTC rejected the proposal on jurisdictional grounds in October 2018.

Books
Law, Privacy and Surveillance in Canada in the Post-Snowden Era 
The Copyright Pentalogy: How the Supreme Court of Canada Shook the Foundations of Canadian Copyright Law
From "Radical Extremism" to "Balanced Copyright": Canadian Copyright and the Digital Agenda 
In the Public Interest:  The Future of Canadian Copyright Law
Internet Law in Canada

Awards
Geist has received numerous awards for his work. He was appointed to the Order of Ontario in 2018 and was awarded the Vox Libera Award for his contribution to freedom of expression by Canadian Journalists for Freedom of Expression (CJFE) in 2018, University of Ottawa Open Access Award in 2016, Kroeger Award for Policy Leadership and the Public Knowledge IP3 Award in 2010, the Les Fowlie Award for Intellectual Freedom from the Ontario Library Association in 2009, the EFF's Pioneer Award in 2008, and Canarie's IWAY Public Leadership Award for his contribution to the development of the Internet in Canada. Geist was named one of Canada's Top 40 Under 40 in 2002. In 2010, he was listed globally as one of the top fifty influential people in regard to intellectual property by Managing Intellectual Property. Canadian Lawyer named him one of the 25 most influential lawyers in Canada in 2011, 2012, and 2013.

References

External links

Videos
NAFTA and the Digital Environment, November 2017
Copyright and NAFTA Renegotiation, October 2017
Canadian Copyright, OA, and OER: Why the Open Access Road Still Leads Back to Copyright, October 2017
Canada and the TPP: A Digital Policy Failure, October 2015
Why Watching the Watchers Isn't Enough, January 2015
Beyond SOPA: ACTA, WIPO and Global Copyright, January 2012
Speech at International Data Protection and Privacy Commissioner's conference, September 2007

1968 births
Living people
Canadian bloggers
Canadian columnists
Lawyers in Ontario
Canadian legal scholars
Computer law scholars
Copyright scholars
Canada Research Chairs
Canadian copyright law
Journalists from Ontario
Members of the Order of Ontario
Writers from Ottawa
University of Western Ontario alumni
Osgoode Hall Law School alumni
Columbia Law School alumni
Academic staff of the University of Ottawa
Alumni of Wolfson College, Cambridge
Toronto Star people
Western Law School alumni